Flugwerft Schleissheim is an aviation museum located in the German town of Oberschleißheim near Munich, it forms part of the Deutsches Museum collection and complements the aviation exhibits on display at the main site. The museum was opened on 18 September 1992. Many aerospace exhibits are on display including fixed-wing aircraft, helicopters and aircraft engines. The main display hangar is a restored glazed building, visitors are able to view exhibits undergoing restoration.

Aircraft on display
List from Deutsches Museum Flugwerft Schleissheim.

Piston engine aircraft

Antonov An-2
Arado Ar 66 (remains)
Arco ultralight
Bölkow Bo 209 Monsun
Brunswick LF-1 Zaunkönig
Bücker Bü 181 Bestmann
Cessna 195
Dornier Do 24 T-3
Douglas C-47D
Fairchild 24
Focke-Wulf Fw 44J Stieglitz
Fokker D.VII
Heinkel He 111 (CASA 2.111B)
Hirth Acrostar
Klemm Kl 25
Lancair IV
LFU 205
SIAT 223 Flamingo
Müller DDMH 22
Pützer Motorraab
Raab Krähe
Ranger M ultralight
Udet U 12 Flamingo
Vollmoeller
Waco YKS-6
Yakovlev Yak-50

Jet and turboprop aircraft
List from Deutsches Museum Flugwerft Schleissheim. 

Canadair CL-13 B Sabre Mk.6
Dornier Do 128-6 Turbo Skyservant
Eurofighter EF-2000 DA 1
Lockheed T-33A
Lockheed F-104G Starfighter
McDonnell Douglas F-4E Phantom II
Mikoyan-Gurevich MiG-21 MF
Panavia Tornado IDS
Rockwell-MBB X-31
Transall C-160
VFW-Fokker 614

VTOL aircraft
List from Deutsches Museum Flugwerft Schleissheim. 
Dornier Do 31 E-3
EWR VJ 101
VFW-Fokker VAK 191B
Dornier Aerodyne E1

Human-powered aircraft
Rochelt Musculair 2

Gliders and motorgliders
List from Deutsches Museum Flugwerft Schleissheim. 

Akaflieg Braunschweig SB-13 Arcus
Akaflieg Karlsruhe AK-1
Akaflieg München Mü10 Milan
Akaflieg München Mü27
Akaflieg Stuttgart FS-29
Bölkow Phoebus C
Condor IV
DFS Kranich II
DFS Olympia Meise
Fauvel AV.36
Goevier III
Grunau Baby IIb
HKS 3
Horten H.IV
Hütter Hü 17a
Kaiser Ka 1
Raab Krähe
Rochelt Solair 1
Scheibe Mü 13E Bergfalke I
Schleicher Ka 6
SG-38
SZD-9 bis 1E Bocian
Valentin Taifun 17E
Wolfmüller glider

Hang gliders
List from Deutsches Museum Flugwerft Schleissheim. 
 Flight Design Exxtacy
 Huber Alpengleiter
 Laser 12.8
 Lilienthal glider
 Pelzner hang glider
 Super Gryphon

Helicopters
List from Deutsches Museum Flugwerft Schleissheim. 
Bell UH-1D
Kamov Ka-26
MBB Bo 105
RHCI Mini-500
Sikorsky S-58
SNCASE S.E. 3130 Alouette II

Rockets/spacecraft
List from Deutsches Museum Flugwerft Schleissheim. 
 V-2 (Rocket motor)
 Europa rocket
 Ariane 5 (Booster)

Aircraft engines
List from Deutsches Museum Flugwerft Schleissheim.

Piston engines

Alvis Leonides
Argus As 17a
Argus Type 4
BMW 132A
BMW 801 TJ
BMW 803
BMW M2B15
Daimler D.IV
Daimler-Benz DB 601
Daimler-Benz DB 610
de Havilland Gipsy Major
Farman 12We
Haacke HFM 2
Hirth HM 60
Hirth HM 504
Junkers L5
Junkers Jumo 211F
Körting 8 SL 116
Lycoming GO-480
Lycoming TIO-360
Oberursel U.III
Porsche PFM 3200
Pratt & Whitney R-1830 Twin Wasp
Pratt & Whitney R-1340 Wasp
Rumpler Aeolus
Salmson AD.3
Walter Mikron 4-II
Wright-Lawrance L4

Gas turbine engines

Allison 250
Allison J33 A
Armstrong Siddeley Double Mamba
Avro Canada Orenda 14
Bristol Orpheus 703
General Electric J79
Junkers Jumo 004
Klimov RD-45
Lycoming T53
Rolls-Royce Pegasus
Rolls-Royce RB162
Rolls-Royce RB145R
Rolls-Royce/MAN Turbo RB193
Rolls-Royce/SNECMA M45H
Tumansky R-29
Turbo-Union RB199 (−101 and −104)
Wright J65

See also
List of aerospace museums

References

Notes

External links

  
 Schleißheim in alten Ansichten

Aerospace museums in Germany
Museums in Bavaria
Munich (district)